The William I. and Magdalen M. Goff House, also known as the Goff House, is a residential structure in El Reno, Oklahoma. Listed on the National Register of Historic Places in 1988, it was built in 1901 and is a landmark in the city of El Reno. It has undergone very few exterior changes since its construction before statehood.

The two-story, Colonial Revival-style house has a circular tower and wraparound porch characteristic of Queen Anne style architecture.

References

Buildings and structures in Canadian County, Oklahoma
Colonial Revival architecture in Oklahoma
Queen Anne architecture in Oklahoma